Kamen Rider 555 is a Japanese tokusatsu drama that serves as the 13th installment in the Kamen Rider franchise and the fourth entry in the Heisei era. The series follows loner, Takumi Inui, and Yuji Kiba, who died and became a monstrous Orphnoch, and their newfound friends as they become involved in a conflict between Smart Brain, Inc., a group of Orphnoch who seek to exterminate humanity, and alumni of the Ryusei School, who were charged with stopping the corporation with technology they are unable to use.

Main characters

Takumi Inui
 is a mysterious loner who became the  after being hit by a car when he was a child. He attempted to use his newfound powers to protect people, but his failure to save the Ryusei School reunion from Kitazaki and an implanted memory that made him believed he was the culprit forced Takumi to isolate himself from others out of fear of betraying them and forget that he became an Orphnoch. By chance, he encounters Mari Sonoda and follows her under the belief that the Faiz Gear case she was carrying was stolen from him days earlier. Amidst conflicts with Masato Kusaka and Yuji Kiba, Takumi accepts his role as Faiz and joins the latter in protecting humans. Eventually, Takumi remembers his true nature as an Orphnoch and learns the truth behind the Ryusei School massacre before settling his rivalry with Kiba while defeating the Arch Orphnoch together.

As the Wolf Orphnoch, Takumi possesses increased power compared to sired and most original Orphnochs and superhuman speed and agility. Additionally, certain gadgets allow Takumi to assume stronger forms, which are as follows:

: A temporary transformation accessed from the stopwatch-like  brace in  that enhances his physical attacks, grants the ability to run at supersonic speed, and allows him to perform enhanced "Axel" versions of his original Exceed Charges with the appropriate gadgets for 10 seconds.

Mari Sonoda
 is a member of the Ryusei School who strives to see the good in others and dreams of becoming a beautician. Though she was sent the Faiz Gear and SB-555V Auto Vajin by their foster father, Hanagata, she was unable to use them. After seeing Takumi Inui successfully use the equipment, she insists he accompany her in fighting the Orphnochs.

Yuji Kiba
 is a friendly and polite young man who became the  after dying in a car crash and ending up in a comatose state for two years. Upon awakening, Yuji discovers his uncle sold his family's company and his girlfriend Chie Morishita left him for his cousin Kazuaki Kiba. After murdering Kazuaki and Morishita in anger, Yuji turns to Smart Brain for protection, only to learn of their tactics and resolve to fight them and protect humans using his Orphnoch powers. In pursuit of this goal, he befriends Yuka Osada and Naoya Kaido, but forms a rivalry with Takumi Inui due to a misunderstanding until they learn each other's true identities and intentions. Upon learning of Yuka's death, who he believed was killed by the police, Yuji kills Masato Kusaka for the Kaixa Gear, discards his ideals, and eventually replaces Kyoji Murakami as the chairman of Smart Brain. However, Yuji's humanity is restored following a final battle with Takumi and he later sacrifices himself to help him defeat the Arch Orphnoch.

In an alternate timeline depicted in the film Kamen Rider 555: Paradise Lost, Yuji maintained his desire to protect humans from other Orphnoch until Osada and Naoya are killed by the Elasmotherium Orphnoch and Yuji is manipulated by Smart Brain into believing humanity had betrayed him. Yuji subsequently sacrifices himself to weaken the Elasmotherium Orphnoch so Takumi can kill it.

As the Horse Orphnoch, Yuji wields a sword and shield and can transform further into a centaur-like . In the series finale and Paradise Lost, Yuji evolves into the Horse Orphnoch's , gaining increased power.

Masato Kusaka
 is a student of the Ryusei School and childhood friend of Mari Sonoda, having fallen in love with her after she saved him from bullies, and failed to attend the Ryusei School reunion. After learning of the massacre, he vowed to destroy the Orphnochs with extreme prejudice and wipe his hands of the blood he essentially spilled that night. To this end, he acquired the Kaixa Gear, which can only be used by Orphnochs or humans implanted with a sufficient amount of Orphnoch DNA, and became , using his implanted Orphnoch DNA to survive the belt's fatal side effects longer than its past human users and developing a rivalry with Takumi Inui. Eventually, Kusaka begins to suffer from the Kaixa Gear's side effects before he is killed by Yuji Kiba.

In alternate timeline depicted in the film Kamen Rider 555: Paradise Lost, Kusaka is killed by Kamen Rider Psyga, who also destroys the Kaixa Gear.

While transformed and similarly to users of the Faiz Gear, he can perform Exceed Charges and wields a variety of gadgets, such as the  digital camera that can also be used in Knuckle Mode for him to perform his own version of the Grand Impact and the  binoculars that he can use in Kick Mode to perform the  Exceed Charge.

Recurring characters

Orphnochs
 are humans reborn as gray animal or plant-themed zombie-like monsters who were meant to be the next stage in human evolution. Two types seen throughout the series are "original" Orphnochs, dead humans who are subsequently resurrected as monsters, and "sired" Orphnochs, humans who survive being attacked by an Orphnoch similarly to vampires and werewolves, though they are weaker than originals. While both types are capable of switching between their human and Orphnoch forms, they suffer from a genetic flaw that causes them to eventually and inevitably disintegrate due to the human body being unable to withstand such a rapid evolution, with the use of Rider Gears accelerating the process. Additionally, there exists a third type called "evolved" Orphnochs, who are genetically perfect and significantly more powerful, but lack the ability to turn back into their human forms and can only reach this stage with assistance from the Arch Orphnoch.

All Orphnochs share superhuman abilities and senses as well as the ability to produce tendrils capable of killing humans or converting them into more Orphnochs. Furthermore, they are capable of withstanding conventional firearms, with some capable of withstanding attacks by Rider Gear users.

In an alternate timeline depicted in the film Kamen Rider 555: Paradise Lost, Orphnochs were able to retain the use of their human forms while adapting away the genetic flaw that shortened their life spans after overthrowing humanity as the dominant species on Earth.

Yuka Osada
 is a teenage girl who was bullied by her younger sister, who their parents favored over her, and other girls from her school and basketball team. Following this, she meets Yuji Kiba and joins him in protecting humans, though she occasionally and secretly kills people she deems "bad guys". Throughout the series, she exchanges texts with Keitaro Kikuchi, eventually developing a semi-romantic relationship with him along the way, and developed a crush on Naoya Kaido, though he does not reciprocate. Near the end of the series, she is mortally wounded by the Bat Orphnoch and killed by Saeko Kageyama.

In an alternate timeline depicted in the film Kamen Rider 555: Paradise Lost, Osada joins Yuji and Kaido in proving to the Human Liberation Army that they were on their side. However, the trio fall into a Smart Brain trap, during which Osada and Kaido are killed by the Elasmotherium Orphnoch.

As the Crane Orphnoch, Osada can fly at incredible speeds, create afterimages, and possesses increased jumping capabilities and lung capacity, and superhuman hearing.

Naoya Kaido
In his younger years, Kaido played the guitar, but was sabotaged by his teacher, who destroyed his motor skills in his left hand, forcing him to abandon music. After struggling with his nature as an Orphnoch, Kaido lives with Yuji and Osada despite not sharing their desire to protect humans. Throughout the series, Kaido sides with Smart Brain, becoming Kamen Rider Faiz on one occasion and commander of their Riotroopers on a separate occasion, but his conscience ultimately stops him from committing heinous acts at the last second. Following Osada and Yuji's deaths, Kaido reintegrates into human society.

In an alternate timeline depicted in the film Kamen Rider 555: Paradise Lost, Kaido joins Yuji and Osada in proving to the Human Liberation Army that they were on their side, only to fall into a Smart Brain trap and come under attack by the Elasmotherium Orphnoch. Despite being mortally wounded, Kaido confesses his feelings to Osada before mounting a failed attack on the Elasmotherium Orphnoch, which eats him.

As the Snake Orphnoch, Kaido can spit acidic venom.

Teruo Suzuki
 is an antisocial young boy whose parents were killed by the Barnacle Orphnoch and was subsequently placed in Smart Brain's orphanage  until Naoya Kaido found him and brought him to stay at the Kikuchi laundromat. Near the end of the series, the grasshopper-like , also known as the Orphnoch King, begins to awaken inside Suzuki as it uses the boy's shadow to consume other Orphnochs and mature. Upon awakening and possessing Suzuki's body, the Arch Orphnoch battles Takumi Inui and Yuji Kiba until the latter sacrifices himself to help the former defeat the Arch Orphnoch, who Saeko Kageyama secretly places in a stasis tank and goes into hiding with.

The Arch Orphnoch resurfaces during the events of the web series Kamen Rider Outsiders, having took control of Smart Brain and found a new aide in the Smart Queen. While attempting to acquire the Gemn Musou Corporation's technology to counter the threat of Zein, the Arch Orphnoch confronts its CEO Kamen Rider Gemn before Gai Amatsu intervenes in an attempt to suggest an alliance to fight Zein instead. However, Gemn and the Arch Orphnoch refuse and take their leave, with the latter declaring that he would never work with humans.

The Arch Orphnoch possesses the ability to "complete" regular Orphnochs' evolution by removing their humanity, pyrokinesis, the most physical strength out of any Orphnoch, and the use of tentacles and finger lasers capable of destroying regular Orphnochs.

Minor Orphnochs
: An Orphnoch with enhanced leaping capabilities and sight, claws, and the ability to produce black poisonous gas who can assume the form of an unnamed professor. While working at Yamanote Music University, he attacks his best students, such as Naoya Kaido, believing humans are unfit to have such talent and should live harsh lives instead, until he is killed by Yuji Kiba as the Horse Orphnoch.
: An Orphnoch who possesses eye stalks that grant omnidirectional vision, the ability to produce mucus that allows him crawl up walls, a left arm that doubles as a hammer, and can assume the identity of an unnamed masked man. He initially chooses not to kill people, instead stealing food to survive. After Smart Brain hires Naoya Kaido to use the Faiz Gear and serve as their enforcer, the Snail Orphnoch is scared into killing people, quickly developing bloodlust in the process until Takumi Inui gets the Faiz Gear back and uses it to kill the Orphnoch.
: An Orphnoch who possesses superhuman speed and the ability to produce toxic spores. They are killed by Masato Kusaka as Kamen Rider Kaixa.
: An Orphnoch who possesses increased swimming capabilities and marksmanship, wrist-mounted fins that can double as melee weapons, the use of a harpoon gun, and can assume the form of an unnamed bicycle riding man, but lacks combat training. He is killed by Takumi Inui as Kamen Rider Faiz.
: The older brother of Yuji Kiba's ex-girlfriend, Chie Morishita. Due to a combination of his transformation and hearing others talk negatively of Chie, Yoshimasa goes on an insanity-induced rampage until he is killed by Takumi Inui as Kamen Rider Faiz.
: An Orphnoch who wields a battering ram staff and can emit poisonous spores and as well as assume the form of an unnamed clown. He pursues a young girl named Keiko Kurata until he is killed by Takumi Inui as Kamen Rider Faiz. The Toadstool Orphnoch is voiced by  while  portrays his human form.
Smart Brain forces Shigehisa to kill people until he is defeated by Takumi as Kamen Rider Faiz, who spares him and tells him to resume his human life.
: An Orphnoch who possesses superhuman strength and an acid shooting gun. After surviving an attack by Aki Sawada, the Frog Orphnoch is killed by Saya Kimura as Kamen Rider Delta.
: An Orphnoch who possesses increased stealth capabilities and gas grenades capable of causing vomiting and skin and eye irritation. After being defeated by Takumi Inui and Masato Kusaka as Kamen Riders Faiz and Kaixa respectively, he attempts to kill Mari Sonoda and Keitaro Kikuchi, only to be killed by Yuji Kiba as the Horse Orphnoch. The Stinkbug Orphnoch is voiced by Katsumi Shiono.
: An Orphnoch who wields a pair of swords capable of slicing through iron and producing high-frequency vibrations and can assume the form of an unnamed gorgeous man. He is killed by Takumi Inui as Kamen Rider Faiz.
: An Orphnoch who can stretch his arms across short distances, produce ink clouds from his nose, and assume the form of a young, unnamed boxer. He is killed by Takumi Inui as Kamen Rider Faiz.
: An arsonist and former employee of Smart Brain who possesses superhuman strength and durability as well as the ability to produce explosive barnacle clusters. After starting fires that would go on to kill Mari Sonoda and Teruo Suzuki's respective parents, the Barnacle Orphnoch was fired and marked for death by Kyoji Murakami for his incompetence and attracting law enforcement. Unaware of Kitazaki's pursuit of him, the Barnacle Orphnoch attempts to steal the Rider Gears, only to be killed by Takumi Inui as Kamen Rider Faiz.
: An Orphnoch with a pincer for a left hand and an enhanced sense of hearing. He was captured and used by human scientists led by Masahiko Minami as a guinea pig until he heard the similarly captive Yuka Osada's screams and breaks out of his confinement to rescue her. After transferring her to Yuji Kiba's custody, the Crab Orphnoch attempts to flee, but ultimately dies from the Orphnochs' genetic flaw.

Smart Brain
 is a company that serves as a front for a group of Orphnochs who view themselves as a master race and are dedicated to overthrowing humanity by either annihilating them or converting them into Orphnochs as well as eliminate Orphnoch who do not agree with their ideals.

In an alternate timeline depicted in the film Kamen Rider 555: Paradise Lost, Smart Brain has become the world's ruling government following the Orphnochs' takeover of Earth.

Kyoji Murakami
Murakami is later overthrown by Hanagata and replaced with Yuji Kiba. Despite this, he seeks out the Arch Orphnoch in the hopes of correcting the Orphnochs' genetic instability, giving his life to awaken him.

In an alternate timeline depicted in the film Kamen Rider 555: Paradise Lost, Murakami was reduced to a head in a jar, but retains a significant command position in Smart Brain until the Elasmotherium Orphnoch fails to kill Takumi Inui and Murakami is murdered by Smart Lady on his superiors' orders.

As the Rose Orphnoch, Murakami possesses levitation, pyrokinesis, increased durability compared to most Orphnochs, and the ability to generate rose petals to damage or distract opponents.

Smart Lady
 is the "mascot" of Smart Brain who works closely with the company's chief and helps fledgling Orphnochs. While she acts friendly and playful towards the many workers at Smart Brain, she does not realize that no one enjoys her company.

Riotroopers
 are Smart Brain's personal army of foot soldiers who all utilize mass-produced  belts.

Lucky Clover
The  are an elite quartet of Orphnochs who answer directly to Smart Brain's Chief.

Itsuro Takuma
Additionally, Takuma continuously seeks to impress Saeko Kageyama, despite fouling up their objectives whenever he does so, and secretly longs to resume his human life. Due to suffering multiple defeats across the series, Kitazaki bullies Takuma, who takes any opportunity to pay him back in kind whenever Kitazaki is weakened or hurt. After witnessing the Arch Orphnoch kill Kitazaki and remove Saeko Kageyama's humanity, Takuma flees and goes into hiding in human society, taking a job as a construction worker.

As the Centipede Orphnoch, Takuma possesses superhuman strength and speed, a body covered in toxic extendable spikes, the ability to fire blue energy rays, 180 degree vision, and the use of a spiky centipede-like whip.

Saeko Kageyama
Enjoying seeing her victims suffer and comforting them in disturbing ways, she has a habit of sending them a bottle of rare wine as their final drink. Upon learning of the Orphnochs' genetic flaw, she successfully seeks out the Arch Orphnoch to become immortal. Following the Arch Orphnoch's defeat, she goes into hiding with it and attends to its injuries.

As the Lobster Orphnoch, Kageyama possesses flexible armor, the ability to fire blue energy balls from her hands, gauntlets capable of withstanding most forms of attack, and the use of a rapier.

J
He is sent to kill Kamen Rider Faiz, but loses his first two lives to Kiyotaka Nishida and Masato Kusaka as Kamen Rider Kaixa. J is reluctant to continue until Kyoji Murakami threatens to brand him a traitor and punish Chaco unless he does so. J is eventually killed by Takumi Inui as Kamen Rider Faiz while Chaco comes into the care of a little girl named Keiko Kurata.

As the Crocodile Orphnoch, J possesses sharp claws and superhuman strength and durability along with his aforementioned three lives, which allow him to revive from attacks that would be fatal to regular Orphnochs. As he revives, he transitions from his initial  to his , which is 1.5 times stronger than his Fight Mode and grants the use of the "Fakris Horn" claw, and his , which is three times stronger than his Fight Mode and grants the use of a sword and the ability to enhance his claws with blue flames.

Aki Sawada
Turning his back on his former life, he kills fellow classmate Saya Kimura to steal the Delta Gear and join Lucky Clover. Not long after joining, he develops a habit of folding animal-themed origami and lighting them on fire before initiating a massacre while listening to rap music, with the flame usually dying out once he kills the last person present. After returning the Delta Gear to the Ryusei School however, Kyoji Murakami brands Sawada a traitor. Realizing he still has some humanity left in him, he battles the other Lucky Clover members, sustaining mortal wounds against them, until he is fatally wounded by Masato Kusaka as Kamen Rider Kaixa. Before he dies, Sawada tells Takumi Inui to continue fighting as Kamen Rider Faiz to save humanity.

As the Spider Orphnoch, Sawada possesses superhuman strength, agility, accuracy, and jumping capabilities, the ability to cling to walls and ceilings, elastic limbs, spider silk-like hair capable of stretching and piercing concrete, fire spider silk from his mouth, a giant eye on his chest that is sensitive to movement, and the use of the "Hapo Shuriken", a wheel with eight spikes and a blade that can inject poison into targets that he can use as a melee and ranged weapon.

Kitazaki
Due to his powers, he became withdrawn from society, developing a childish outlook on others' suffering, which he sees as fun. Throughout the series, Kitazaki briefly uses the Delta Gear to become Kamen Rider Delta before becoming bored of it and successfully defeats the other Riders several times until he is defeated by Takumi Inui as Kamen Rider Faiz, which drives Kitazaki insane. Seeking revenge, Kitazaki would go on to battle Takumi several times, clashing with his fellow Lucky Clover members in the process. During the series finale, Kitazaki attempts to kill the Arch Orphnoch to prove his superiority, only to be killed by the Orphnoch King.

In his human form, Kitazaki can turn anything he touches to ash, exhale red gas capable of disintegrating anything it comes into contact with, and fire destructive red energy blasts.

Minor members
: An Orphnoch who can assume a merman-esque  and the identity of a traveler named . He is sent to retrieve the Faiz Gear, only to be killed by Takumi Inui as Kamen Rider Faiz.
: An Orphnoch who wields a cannon, can transform from his regular humanoid  to his giant centaur-like , and assume the identity of an unnamed biker. He attempts to steal the Faiz Gear, attacking Mari Sonoda in the process, until he is killed by Takumi Inui as Kamen Rider Faiz.
He is tasked with retrieving the Faiz Gear, only to be killed by Takumi Inui as Kamen Rider Faiz.
While attempting to retrieve the Faiz Gear, he is betrayed and killed by Akai as Kamen Rider Faiz.
While working with Midorikawa to retrieve the Faiz Gear, Akai uses it to betray and kill him until Keitaro Kikuchi retrieves the Fair Gear for Takumi Inui, who uses it to kill Akai in turn.
He came to Japan to locate the Faiz Gear, but is reassigned to help Yuji Kiba and Yuka Osada better understand their new Orphnoch forms. When the pair refuse to sire more Orphnochs, Toda attempts to set an example for them by going on a rampage, siring Naoya Kaido as the Snake Orphnoch in the process, only to be killed by Takumi Inui as Kamen Rider Faiz.
: An Orphnoch with armor-like skin, superhuman strength, a rapier, a back-mounted shield, and antlers capable of picking up radio and sound waves who can assume the identity of an unnamed, bespectacled man. He is assigned to retrieve the Faiz Gear by tailing Takumi Inui, who uses the Faiz Gear to kill him.
: A potential candidate for J's replacement in the Lucky Clover who can produce acidic mucus from his hands capable of melting concrete and assume the form of an unnamed salaryman. He is killed by Takumi Inui as Kamen Rider Faiz.
In the hopes of joining the Lucky Clover, the pair steal the Faiz and Kaixa Gears, but are told by Kyoji Murakami that only one of them can join and the position will go to whoever kills Yuji Kiba. Taking Kaido's words to heart, Kobayashi kidnaps Yuka Osada, which angers Kaido. Kobayashi escapes from Yuji, Osada, and Kaido, only to be killed by Masato Kusaka as Kamen Rider Kaixa.
: An Orphnoch serving under Kyoji Murakami who possesses samurai-like chain mail armor and wields a halberd. He is killed by Masato Kusaka as Kamen Rider Delta.
: An Orphnoch serving under Kyoji Murakami who possesses samurai-like armor and a forked staff. He is killed by Shuji Mihara as Kamen Rider Delta.
: An Orphnoch serving under Itsuro Takuma who possesses sharp claws, shurikens made from his feathers, and flying capabilities. He is killed by Yuji Kiba as Kamen Rider Faiz.
 An associate of Kitazaki's who wields an axe, a net, and a helmet that grants increased headbutting capabilities. He assists Kitazaki in attacking Takumi Inui as Kamen Rider Faiz, who eventually kills the Okra Orphnoch. The Okra Orphnoch is voiced by Katsumi Shiono.
: An associate of Saeko Kageyama's who wields a rapier and shield. He joins her in testing Yuka Osada's abilities until he is killed by Takumi Inui as Kamen Rider Faiz. The Frilled Lizard Orphnoch is voiced by Katsumi Shiono.
: An Orphnoch who wields two pistols and shoulder-mounted blades that can double as boomerangs and can assume the form of an unnamed man wearing sunglasses. While aiding Masahiko Minami on Kyoji Murakami's orders, the Bat Orphnoch mortally wounds Yuka Osada and fights Naoya Kaido and Shuji Mihara as Kamen Rider Delta before Takumi Inui as Kamen Rider Faiz kills the Bat Orphnoch.
: An Orphnoch who possesses the ability to fire a gel solution capable of immobilizing targets from his three tube-like mouths, increased durability, a rod-covered body capable of diffusing melee attacks, and wields a double-headed spear and can assume the form of an unnamed leather jacketed man. After being targeted by Teruo Suzuki, the Coral Orphnoch reveals the child's existence to Kyoji Murakami before attempting to kill Suzuki before he can become the Orphnoch King, only to be killed by Takumi Inui and Shuji Mihara as Kamen Riders Faiz and Delta respectively.

Other members
: A female Smart Brain employee who is killed by Kamen Rider Kaixa and appears exclusively in the film Kamen Rider 555: Paradise Lost.
: A Riotrooper commander who appears exclusively in the film Kamen Rider 555: Paradise Lost. He is tasked with eliminating the Human Liberation Army, only to be killed by Keitaro Kikuchi as Kamen Rider Kaixa.
: A giant Orphnoch under Murakami's command that is perpetually in its beast-like Raging Mode and appears exclusively in the film Kamen Rider 555: Paradise Lost. After attacking Yuji Kiba's group as part of a Smart Brain trap, Murakami sends the Elasmotherium Orphnoch to kill Takumi Inui as Kamen Rider Faiz, who eventually kills it after Yuji sacrifices himself to wound it.
: An unnamed member of Smart Brain's Special Forces who appears exclusively in the stage show Kamen Rider Battle Stage: Faiz vs Delta.
: An unnamed member of Smart Brain's Special Forces who appears exclusively in the stage show Kamen Rider Battle Stage: Faiz vs Delta.
: An unnamed member of Smart Brain's Special Forces who appears exclusively in the stage show Kamen Rider Battle Stage: Faiz vs Delta.

Keitaro Kikuchi
 is a young man who dreams of making everyone in the world happy and possesses an Orphnoch allergy, though he believes he is allergic to people with bad hearts. After meeting Mari Sonoda and Takumi Inui by chance after they acquired the Faiz Gear, he allows them to stay with him at his family's dry cleaning business, in exchange for room and board in the hopes of encouraging them to use the Faiz Gear for good. Throughout the series, he exchanges texts with his pen pal, "Yuka", and becomes infatuated with Yuka Osada despite being unaware that they are the same person until later in the series.

Ryusei School
The  is a group of orphans fostered by Smart Brain's former chief, Hanagata, and schooled under their teacher, . Prior to the series' beginning, they attended a reunion, where all of the alumni present were either killed or sired as Orphnoch, with only Masato Kusaka retaining his memories of the attack since he was not there. Hanagata sent the survivors three Rider Gears to combat the Orphnoch, but they are unable to use two of them due to compatibility issues and fatal side effects while the third causes megalomania.

Hanagata
To this end, he secretly took in orphans and had them experimented on to determine their potential for evolving into Orphnochs and locate the Arch Orphnoch. Furthermore, he developed the Rider Gears, most of which can only be used by Orphnochs or humans implanted with a sufficient amount of Orphnoch DNA, to protect the Arch Orphnoch once they were found. However, he discovered he was dying due to his Orphnoch nature, realized the error of his ways, and disappeared, taking the Rider Gears with him in the hopes of stopping humanity from becoming monsters. He would go on to become the Ryusei School's foster father and secretly give them the Rider Gears, believing they would be able to stop the other Orphnochs, and watched over them from the shadows for years.

In the present, Hanagata resurfaces to aid Takumi Inui and Masato Kusaka by giving them new equipment before stripping Smart Brain's current chief, Kyoji Murakami, of his duties and appointing Yuji Kiba as the permanent head of the company in response to the Arch Orphnoch's eventual awakening. While attempting to see his students, Mari Sonoda and Rina Abe, one more time, he is stopped by Kusaka, who learned of Hanagata's true nature as an Orphnoch. Hanagata stops him from transforming, but ultimately dies telling Kusaka to keep living due to miscalculating his time of death.

As the Goat Orphnoch, Hanagata possesses superhuman strength, speed, and agility as well as sharp horns. Additionally, he is trained in kenpō.

Rina Abe
 is a former alumnus of the Ryusei School who worked at Sousai Children's Home. She and her fellow alumni initially attempt to find a suitable user for the Kaixa Gear before most of them fall victim to the Delta Gear's addictive side effect. Abe temporarily takes up the mantle of Kamen Rider Delta and overcomes the side effect, but her lack of combat prowess forces her to give it to her friend Shuji Mihara, who initially refuses. After being hospitalized while retrieving the Delta Gear, she inspires Mihara to use it to fight the Orphnochs and goes on to become the head of Sousai Children's Home.

Kyosuke Tokumoto
 is a Ryusei School alumnus who tries to use the Kaixa Gear, but failed to out of fear due to its fatal side effects. After finding and using the Delta Gear before it was stolen by former classmate Aki Sawada, Tokumoto comes to believe that it is rightfully his due to its megalomaniacal side effects and joins forces with Ken Arai to kidnap Mari Sonoda in an attempt to lure out Sawada and take the Delta Gear back, only to be killed by Sawada.

Shuji Mihara
 is an initially cowardly and pessimistic alumnus of the Ryusei School who desires to live a normal life and not involve himself with the Orphnochs. After helping Takumi Inui and Yuji Kiba defeat the Arch Orphnoch, Mihara joins Abe in running the Sousai Children's Home.

Mihara utilizes the Delta Gear's  belt in conjunction with the  walkie-talkie and the  camcorder to transform. Additionally, he possesses the  combat motorcycle. Unlike the other Rider Gears, the Delta Gear can be used by humans and Orphnoch, though it induces megalomania in most of its users.

Minor members
: The first user of the Delta Gear who takes on a part-time job at Kikuchi Dry Cleaning and intended to hand off the Delta Gear to Takumi Inui before she is killed by Aki Sawada.
: An alumnus who temporarily assumes the Kaixa Gear, using it to deplete the Crocodile Orphnoch's first life, only to die in Mr. Masuda's arms due to the Kaixa Gear's fatal side effect.
: An alumnus who uses the Kaixa Gear to battle the Crocodile Orphnoch against his classmates' protests, only for the Orphnoch to knock the belt off of him, causing Shindo to revert and disintegrate from the belt's fatal side effect.
: An alumnus who tries to take the Delta Gear, only to be killed by Yuki Kawachi.
: An alumnus who temporarily uses the Delta Gear and became obsessed with it due to its megalomaniacal side effect. He joins forces with Kyosuke Tokumoto to kidnap Mari Sonoda, lure Aki Sawada into a trap, and get the Delta Gear back, only to be killed by Sawada.
: An alumnus who briefly uses the Delta Gear, succumbs to its side effect, and attacks Ken Arai and kills Asami Ito over it. After being attacked and fatally wounded by the Frog Orphnoch, Kawachi calls Masato Kusaka for help and claims that Aki Sawada had taken the Delta Gear before dying of his injuries.

Masahiko Minami
 is a heartless and corrupt high-ranking officer of the National Police Agency and mad scientist who believes monsters such as Orphnochs deserved to be experimented on or used as weapons. He also believes in using others regardless of species for personal gain and eliminating hindrances. After halting a police investigation into Yuka Osada so he can use her in his experiments, he arranges a deal with Smart Brain to use the Crab Orphnoch as well before capturing Osada. However, his captives escape while Minami is eventually killed by a vengeful Yuji Kiba.

Spin-off exclusive characters

Leo
 is a foreign English-speaking Orphnoch and member of Smart Brain who uses the Psyga Gear, one of two "perfect" Gears developed by Smart Brain, to transform into , and appears exclusively in the film Kamen Rider 555: Paradise Lost. He leads the Orphnochs in their crusade to exterminate humanity under the personal supervision of Kyoji Murakami until he is killed in battle by Takumi Inui as Kamen Rider Faiz.

While transformed, he possesses strength rivaling that of Kamen Rider Kaixa, speed rivaling that of Kamen Rider Faiz Axel Form, and the  jetpack, which can convert into .

Smart Queen
 is an Orphnoch, the "mascot" of Smart Brain, and a secretary to the company's chief who assumes the appearance of Mari Sonoda and appears exclusively in the web-exclusive series Kamen Rider Genms: Smart Brain and the 1000% Crisis and Kamen Rider Outsiders. She uses the Delta Gear to fight Kuroto Dan, who kills her.

Smart Queen is portrayed by Yuria Haga, who also portrays Mari Sonoda.

Notes

External links
 

Faiz
Kamen Rider 555